Big Timber is a 1917 American silent film Northwoods/drama produced by the Oliver Morosco Company and distributed by Paramount Pictures. It was directed by William Desmond Taylor and starred Kathlyn Williams and Wallace Reid. It is not known whether the film currently survives, and it may be a lost film.

The film was remade under the same title in 1924 by Universal with William Desmond starring.

Plot
As described in a film magazine review, after the death of her father leaves Stella Benton (Williams) without a home, she goes to live with her brother Charlie (Paget) in the timber regions. The roughness of her surroundings proves a burden to Stella, and when Jack Fife (Reid), who loves her, asks her to marry him, she accepts even through she does not love him. Jack tries to win his bride's love, but to no avail. Finally, she goes to the city to try and forget her unhappy married life. She becomes infatuated with Walter Monahan (King), but after she sees him at a cafe with another woman, she realizes his fickleness, and her love for Jack comes to the surface. She returns to the timber regions where she is happily received by her husband.

Cast

Kathlyn Williams as Stella Benton
Wallace Reid as Jack Fife
Joe King as Walter Monahan
Alfred Paget as Charlie Benton
Helen Bray as Linda Abbey

unbilled
John Burton as undetermined

Reception
Like many American films of the time, Big Timber was subject to cuts by city and state film censorship boards. The Chicago Board of Censors required a cut in the scene involving the shooting of a man.

References

External links

Big Timber; allmovie.com
 lobby poster Big Timber

1917 films
American silent feature films
Films directed by William Desmond Taylor
Silent American drama films
1917 drama films
Films based on Canadian novels
American black-and-white films
Censored films
1910s American films